Josep Caballé Domenech (born 1973) is a Spanish musician and conductor. Caballé Domenech has recently been appointed Principal Conductor of the Moritzburg Festival Germany) and he is also in his eighth season as Music Director of the Colorado Springs Philharmonic(USA). Besides, former General Music Director of the Staatskapelle Halle (Germany) from 2013 to 2018,  Music Director of the Bogotá Philharmonic Orchestra (Colombia) during 2018 as well as principal guest conductor of the Norrköping Symphony (Sweden) from 2005 to 2007. “Protégé” of Sir Colin Davis in the inaugural cycle of Rolex Mentor and Protégé Arts Initiative. Caballé Domenech enjoys combining his conducting career with a great symphonic and operatic repertoire.

Life and career
Josep Caballé-Domenech was born in Barcelona, Spain, into a family of musicians. He studied piano, percussion, singing and violin and took conducting lessons with David Zinman and Jorma Panula at the Aspen Music Festival, Sergiu Comissiona, and also at Vienna's University of Music and Scenic Arts.

Conducting career
Josep Caballé Domenech has worked with an impressive list of orchestras such as the Royal Philharmonic Orchestra with whom he recorded "Respighi's Roman Trilogy" for Onyx Classics, Tonhalle Orchester Zurich, WDR Cologne, Swedish Radio Symphony Orchestra, Stockholm Philharmonic, Czech Philharmonic, Munich Radio Orchestra, RSO Wien, Bern Symphony Orchestra, Orchestra Sinfónica Milano Giuseppe Verdi, the New Japan Philharmonic, Barcelona Symphony Orchestra, Galicia Symphony Orchestra, Euskadi Symphony Orchestra, Extremadura Orchestra, Orchestra of RTVE Madrid, Houston Symphony, San Antonio Symphony, Fort Worth Symphony Orchestra and OFUNAM México among others. His most recent debuts were with the Netherlands Radio Chamber Philharmonic at Amsterdam's Concertgebouw, the Orchestre National de Montpellier Languedoc-Roussillon, the Chile Symphony Orchestra, the Baltimore Symphony Orchestra, the Bilken Philharmonic Orchestra in Ankara and Orchestre national du Capitole du Toulouse, among others. Additionally he is a regular guest at summer festivals like Aspen Music Festival, Texas Music Festival Houston, Wintergreen Festival in the US, Londrina Festival in Brasil and Moritzburg Festival in Germany.

Recognized also for his work with operatic repertoire, Maestro Caballé Domenech made his opera debut at Barcelona's Liceu conducting performances of Mozart's Così fan tutti. Subsequent productions at the Liceu include Haydn's Il mondo della luna, Donizetti's L'elisir d'amore, Granados's Maria del Carmen, and Donizetti's Lucia di Lammermoor. He has also led Liceu productions at the Savonlinna Festival and at La Fenice in Venice. Subsequently, Josep Caballé Domenech was invited by further European opera companies, including Le nozze di Figaro at the State Opera Stuttgart, Vienna's Volksoper (new production of "Tosca", among others) and Theater an der Wien with Plácido Domingo in the principal role, Teatro San Carlo Lisbon, Capitol du Toulouse, ABAO in Bilbao, Komische Oper Berlin, Teatre Royal du Versailles in Paris, Deutsche Staatsoper Berlin, Essen Aalto-Theater and Semperoper Dresden.

Recent Highlights includes the premiere of E. Palomar ballet "Negro Goya" at the 60th International Granada Festival, debut at the Royal Albert Hall London with the Royal Philharmonic Orchestra, debut at the Semperoper Dresden with Mozart's Nozze di Figaro and a new production of Bizet's Carmen and performances of Rossini's Barbier, Kömische Oper Berlin, Teatre Royal du Versailles in Paris, Montpellier Orchestra, Concertgebouw Amsterdam with the Radio Chamber Orchestra, Euskadi Symphony Orchestra, Belo Horizonte Philharmonic in Brasil, Tampere Philharmonic in Finland, Puccini's Boheme at the Staatsoper Berlin and Wagner's Ring in Halle, Strauss' Salome at the Teatro Mayor in Bogotá, Donizetti's Roberto Devereux at ABAO in Bilbao, Puccini's Fanciulla del West at the Staatsoper Hamburg, a South American Tour with the Staatskapelle Halle and a concert with Yo Yo Ma that marked the 90th Anniversary Gala of the Colorado Springs Philharmonic Orchestra, among others.

Recent and future commitments: the Theralogy of the Ring of the Nibelungo of Wagner, the Flying Dutchman, Aida, Tosca, Adriana Lecouvreur and Sweeney Todd in the Halle Opera; the Fanciulla del West, Leoncavallo's Pagliacci and Cavalleria Rusticana at the Hamburg Staatsoper; Salomé, El Caballero de la Rosa at the Teatro Mayor in Bogotá; debuts at the Teatro de la Zarzuela in Madrid and the Teatro Real in concert with Bryn Terfel; appearances with the Philharmonic of Nuremberg, Philharmonic of Dortmund, Tucson Symphony, Camera Musicae in the Palau de la Música of Barcelona, the collaboration with Lang Lang and the Orchestra of the Palau de les Arts of Valencia, concert with Dresden Festspielorchester at the Elbphilharmonie in Hamburg, and the concert with Yo-Yo Ma in the gala-celebration of the 90th Anniversary of the Colorado Springs Philharmonic Orchestra.

Awards
Josep Caballé-Domenech was awarded the Aspen Prize from the American Academy of Conducting at Aspen. He was selected to be 'Sir Colin Davis' Protégé' in the first Rolex Mentor and Protégé Arts Initiative's inaugural cycle (2002–2003). Also, he was the winner of the 1st Concurso Jóvenes Directores de Orquesta Sinfónica del Principado de Asturias (2000) and of the 13th Nicolai Malko International Competition for Young Conductors (2001).

References

External links 
 
 General Management
 Oficial Website Moritzburg Festival
 Orquesta Filarmónica de Bogotá Website
 Colorado Springs Philharmonic Orchestra Website
 Staatskapelle Halle Website
 Rolex Mentor and Protégé Arts Initiative
 Onyx CDs by Josep Caballé Domenech&Royal Philharmonic Orchestra

1973 births
Living people
Aspen Music Festival and School alumni
Spanish conductors (music)
Male conductors (music)
Music directors
University of Music and Performing Arts Vienna alumni
21st-century conductors (music)
21st-century male musicians
Spanish male musicians